Jim Kwik is an American brain coach, podcaster, writer, and entrepreneur.  He is the founder of Kwik Learning, an online learning platform; the host of the Kwik Brain podcast; and the author of Limitless, published by Hay House in 2020. 

Kwik was born and raised in Westchester, New York. He had significant learning challenges as the result of a traumatic brain injury he sustained when he was in kindergarten  and taught himself to read and write by reading comic books. He later taught himself to speed read.

In 2001, he founded Kwik Learning.  He taught accelerated learning programs in classrooms and at companies until 2009, when Kwik Learning launched as an online learning platform. As of 2022, it had been used by students in 195 countries.  

The Kwik Brain podcast debuted in 2017 and in 2022 became one of the top educational podcasts on iTunes. Limitless was released in 2020.  It appeared on the Wall Street Journal,  New York Times and USA Today bestseller lists.  

Kwik speaks at conferences and seminars on accelerated learning techniques.

Bibliography
Limitless: Upgrade Your Brain, Learn Anything Faster, and Unlock Your Exceptional Life; Hay House; April 7, 2020; 344 pp;

References

External links
 kwikbrain.com 
 10 Things That Will Change Your Life Immediately

People from Westchester County, New York
American podcasters
American non-fiction writers
Businesspeople from New York (state)
1973 births
Living people